This article contains a list of awards and accolades won by and awarded to Frank Sinatra.

Awards and honors

 1954 Academy Award winner – Best Supporting Actor
 11-time Grammy Award winner
 four-time Golden Globe Award winner
 1966 Peabody Award winner
 1971 Cecil B. DeMille Award winner
 Medal of Honour of the State of Israel (1972)
 Screen Actors Guild Life Achievement Award (1972)
 Honorary Citizen of Chicago (1975)
 Scopus Award from the American Friends of the Hebrew University of Jerusalem (1976)
 Honorary Doctorate litterarum humanarum (University of Nevada, Las Vegas, 1976)
 Grand Officer of the Order of Merit of the Italian Republic (1979)
 American Society of Composers, Authors and Publishers Pied Piper Award (Las Vegas, 1979)
 Johnny Mercer Award from the Songwriters Hall of Fame (1980)
 Big Band and Jazz Hall of Fame (class of 1980)
 National Broadcasters Hall of Fame (class of 1982)
 Kennedy Center for the Performing Arts Medal of Honor Award (1983)
 Honorary Doctorate of Fine Arts (Loyola Marymount University – 1984)
 Austrian Cross of Honour for Science and Art, 1st class (1984)
 Presidential Medal of Freedom (1985)
 Honorary Doctor of Engineering from the Stevens Institute of Technology (1985)
 NAACP Lifetime Achievement Award (1987)
 Society of Singers Lifetime Achievement Award (1990)
 Ella Award (1990)
 Distinguished Life Achievement Award (Honorary Award for lifetime achievement) of the American Cinema Awards (1992)
 Career Achievement Award (Palm Springs International Film Festival, 1993)
 Gaming Hall of Fame (class of 1997)
 Congressional Gold Medal (presented posthumously in 1998)
 American Music Award of Merit (1998)
 Named as the "Greatest Voice of the 20th Century" by BBC Radio 2 (2001) 
 Each year on Sinatra's birthday, (December 12), the Empire State Building lights up with blue lights in reference to Sinatra's nickname, "Ol' Blue Eyes".
 Honorary membership of Alpha Phi Delta
 Three stars on the Hollywood Walk of Fame:
 For Motion pictures at 1600 Vine Street
 For Recording at 1637 Vine Street
 For Television at 6538 Hollywood Blvd.
 Hit Parade Hall of Fame. (class of 2007)
 New Jersey Hall of Fame (class of 2008).
 Star on the Las Vegas Walk of Stars (2010).
 America Award in memory of the Italy-USA Foundation in 2015.
 Asteroid 7934 Sinatra named in his honor.

Film industry awards

Academy Awards

Nominated – Academy Award for Best Actor
 The Man with the Golden Arm (1955)

Nominated – Academy Award for Best Original Song
 "I Couldn't Sleep a Wink Last Night" from the motion picture Higher and Higher
 Composed by Jimmy McHugh with lyrics by Harold Adamson (sung by Frank Sinatra) (1943)

Nominated – Academy Award for Best Original Song
 "I Fall in Love too Easily" from the motion picture Anchors Aweigh
 Composed by Sammy Cahn with lyrics by Jule Styne (sung by Frank Sinatra) (1945)

Academy Award for Best Original Song
 "Three Coins in the Fountain" from the motion picture Three Coins in the Fountain
 Composed by Sammy Cahn with lyrics by Jimmy Van Heusen (sung by Frank Sinatra) (1954)

Nominated – Academy Award for Best Original Song
 "(Love Is) The Tender Trap" from the motion picture The Tender Trap
 Composed by Sammy Cahn with lyrics by Jimmy Van Heusen (sung by Frank Sinatra) (1955)

Academy Award for Best Original Song
 "All the Way" from the motion picture The Joker Is Wild
 Composed by Sammy Cahn with lyrics by Jimmy Van Heusen (sung by Frank Sinatra) (1957)

Academy Award for Best Original Song
 "High Hopes" from the motion picture A Hole in the Head 
 Composed by Sammy Cahn with lyrics by Jimmy Van Heusen (sung by Frank Sinatra) (1959)

Nominated – Academy Award for Best Original Song
 "My Kind of Town" from the motion picture Robin and the 7 Hoods
 Composed by Sammy Cahn with lyrics by Jimmy Van Heusen (sung by Frank Sinatra) (1964)

Television industry awards

Down Beat Polls
 Readers' poll Male Singer of the Year sixteen times between 1941 and 1966
 Readers' poll Personality of the Year six times between 1954 and 1959
 Critics' poll Male Singer of the Year twice, in 1955 and 1957.

Recording industry awards

Grammys

The Grammy Awards began in 1958, after two peaks of Sinatra's recording career had already happened, but Sinatra still won eleven Grammy Awards – his work was nominated over 30 times – in his career and has been presented with the Grammy Hall of Fame Award along with the Academy's highest honours, their Lifetime, and Legend Awards. With three wins he is one of only five artists and groups who have won the Grammy Award for Album of the Year more than once as the main credited artist.

Playboy Awards
 Jazz All-Star Poll Male Vocalist of the Year seven times between 1957 and 1964.

NME Awards

|-
| rowspan=2|1955
| rowspan=4|Himself
| World's Outstanding Singer 
| 
|-
| rowspan=2|Outstanding American Male Singer 
| 
|-
| rowspan=2|1956
| 
|-
| Outstanding Popular Singer in World 
|

References

Awards
Sinatra, Frank